The Fraser River in northern Labrador flows west to east in geological trench. The gorge is narrow and deep. The upper watershed drains to Tasisuak Lake. Eastward the rift widens to shallow, brackish ponds where flow reverses with the flush of tide.

In 1910, British explorer Hesketh Prichard ascended the river, continuing through Bear Ravine to access Indian House Lake on George River.

See also
List of rivers of Newfoundland and Labrador

References

External links
 Through Trackless Labrador, from Open Library

Rivers of Newfoundland and Labrador